Gekko khunkhamensis is a species of gecko. It is found in Laos.

References

Gekko
Reptiles described in 2021
Endemic fauna of Laos
Reptiles of Laos